Misamis Oriental, officially the Province of Misamis Oriental, is a province located in the region of Northern Mindanao in the Philippines. Its capital, largest city and provincial center is the city of Cagayan de Oro, which is governed independently from the province.

History

In the 16th century, the people of the territory were obliged to pay tribute to Muslim rulers as the regional powerhouses converted to the Muslim faith. Lumads on the coast started converting into Islam or were displaced by other ethnic groups that converted earlier. Those in the interior retained their native faiths.

Province of Cebu
Misamis Oriental shared a history with Misamis Occidental of being part of the Province of Cebu during the Spanish colonial era. In 1818, Misamis was carved out from Cebu to become a separate province with Cagayan de Misamis (Cagayan de Oro) as its capital and was further subdivided into partidos or divisions: Partido de Cagayan (Division of Cagayan), Partido de Catarman (Division of Catarman), Partido de Dapitan (Division of Dapitan), and Partido de Misamis (Division of Misamis). The new Misamis province was part of the districts of Mindanao during the later part of the 19th Century, with its territory spanning from Dapitan to the west, Gingoog to the East, and as far as Lanao and Cotabato to the south.

Misamis is one of the Spanish-controlled territories vulnerable to Moro raids. The Fuerza de la Concepcion y del Triunfo in Ozamiz was built as a Spanish military installation and one of the staging points in their expeditions against Moros. A fort in Balo-i in present-day Lanao del Norte was also constructed in 1891 on the orders of General Valeriano Weyler in its renewed campaign against the Maranaos. The Fuerza de San Miguel in Iligan was also built, serving as a muster point for Spanish forces in their campaigns in Lanao.

Misamis province

With the organization of the Department of Mindanao and Sulu in 1917, Misamis lost a territory covering Iligan and coastal towns along Iligan and Panguil bays to become part of the Lanao province, making the remaining western and eastern territories of Misamis isolated from each other. Highland areas south of Cagayan de Misamis down to Malaybalay area were carved out to become a sub-province of Bukidnon in 1914, then eventually a full province in 1917.

Legislative Act. No. 3537 approved on November 2, 1929, divided the province of Misamis into two due to the lack of geographic contiguity. It was not until a decade later, on November 28, 1939, that the division between Misamis Oriental and Misamis Occidental was implemented by Act. No. 3777. When Misamis Oriental separated, Don Gregorio Pelaez became its first governor.

World War II
In 1942, at the onset of World War II in the Philippines, Japanese soldiers landed in Misamis Oriental to occupy the region. Filipino and American resistance guerrillas operated in the hills and forests of Misamis Oriental and Bukidnon, and both provinces fell under the jurisdiction of the 10th Military District commanded by Col. Wendell Fertig.

The American liberation forces landed in Cagayan in May 1945, with the support of the Filipino and American guerrillas based in Opol, Gingoog, and Tagoloan clearing the beachhead of Japanese defenders for the liberation forces to land.

Modern history
Subsequent creations of new local government units in the province occurred after the war. Opol and El Salvador were barangays of Cagayan, but due to their relative isolation from the Cagayan town proper, the residents petitioned for their separation to become municipalities in 1948. El Salvador became a municipality within the said year, while Opol was carved out from Cagayan in 1950, the same year the latter was chartered to become a city. Lagonglong was organized as a separate municipality out of the 11 sitios of Balingasag which were then grouped into 5 barangays. Villanueva was created out of the 5 barrios of Tagoloan in 1962, and the municipality of Libertad out of the 6 barrios of Initao in 1963.

The island of Camiguin was part of the province, and in 1958 it was made into a sub-province. The island eventually separated from Misamis Oriental and achieved regular province status in 1966, with Mambajao as its new provincial capital.
 
In May 2014 it was reported that an area in Barangay Lapad in Laguindingan, Misamis Oriental, in northern Mindanao, was declared a heritage site. Oyster fossils older than 200,000 years were discovered, according to Balita Pilipinas. Property owner, Raul Ilogon, told Balita Pilipinas that they had been seeing the fossils for 20 years thinking that they were ordinary rocks.

Geography

Located in Northern Mindanao, the province borders Bukidnon to the south, Agusan del Norte to the east and Lanao del Norte to the west. On the north is the Bohol Sea with the island-province of Camiguin just off its northern coast.

Misamis Oriental, as a coastal province, is dominated by two bays to the north; the Macajalar and the Gingoog Bay. The central portion of the province features several rivers originating from the highlands of Bukidnon, such as the Cagayan.

Administrative divisions
Misamis Oriental comprises 23 municipalities and 2 component cities, which are organized into two legislative districts and further subdivided into 424 barangays. The provincial capital, Cagayan de Oro, is a highly urbanized city that is administered independently from the province.

Demographics

Language
Cebuano is the primary spoken language of the province, with the vast majority claiming it to be their mother tongue. Many are fluent in Tagalog and English, which are mainly used for business, education, and administration. Maranao is also spoken among the Maranao communities within the province. Other languages that may be heard in the province include Higaonon and Subanon.

Religion
Roman Catholicism predominates in the province with roughly 68% of the population. Other Christian denominations compose most of the minority religions that forms 9% of the Population with 28% belongs Iglesia Filipina Independiente  while Islam has a small but steadily increasing number.

Economy

The province is host to industries such as agricultural, forest, steel, metal, chemical, mineral, rubber and food processing. It is home to the 30 square kilometre PHIVIDEC Industrial Estate and the Mindanao International Container Port, all in Tagoloan. Del Monte Philippines, which exports pineapples all over the Asia-Pacific region, has a processing plant in Cagayan de Oro.

On January 10, 2008, Hanjin Heavy Industries and Construction Company of South Korea inked a contract to build a $2 billion shipyard building complex at Villanueva, Misamis Oriental with the PHIVIDEC Industrial Authority. It is bigger than Hanjin's $1 billion shipyard complex in Subic and Olongapo which will hire 20,000 Filipinos to manufacture ship parts. The government declared the 441.8-hectare project site an economic zone (part of 3,000-hectare industrial estate managed by PHIVIDEC).

Government

Misamis Oriental Provincial Government 2022-2025

Executive officials
 Congressmen:
 1st District of Misamis Oriental with Gingoog: Christian S. Unabia (Lakas–CMD)
 2nd District of Misamis Oriental with El Salvador: Yevgeny Vicente B. Emano (Nacionalista Party)
 Governor: Peter M. Unabia (Lakas–CMD)
 Vice Governor: Jeremy Jonahmar G. Pelaez (Padayon)

Members of the Sangguniang Panlalawigan

 1st District:
 Wayne T. Militante (Padayon)
 Marlon C. Kho (Lakas–CMD)
 Rey B. Buhisan (Lakas–CMD)
 Frederick Y. Khu (Lakas–CMD)
 Jabi Abing I. Bernaldez (NUP)
 2nd District:
 Syremae N. Emano (Nacionalista Party)
 Gerardo P. Sabal III (Padayon)
 Dexter B. Yasay (Padayon)  
 Princess N. Emano (NUP)
 Bliss Francis J. Acain (NUP)
Sectoral
 Leonard Winstanley - ABC President (Non-partisan)
 Michelle Anayron - PCL President (PDP–Laban)
 Kerwin Jess Soldevilla - SK Federation President (Non-partisan)
 Alan Mandokita - IPMR (Non-partisan)

See also
 Misamis Occidental
 Misamis

References

External links

 
 
 Official website of the Province of Misamis Oriental
 Philippine Standard Geographic Code
 Local Governance Performance Management System

 
Provinces of the Philippines
Provinces of Northern Mindanao
States and territories established in 1939
1939 establishments in the Philippines